Parque Lecocq is a nature reserve northwest of Montevideo, Uruguay, near the town of Santiago Vázquez.  It houses mammals and birds and protects flora and pursues/supports breeding programs.  It is adjacent to protected wetlands.

Its mandate is to be a "support centre for biodiversity conservation both nationally and internationally."

The zoo houses one of the largest communities of the Addax antelope (a critically endangered species) in the world.

Ana Olivera, the mayor of Montevideo, has announced plans to move the animals of Zoo de Villa Dolores (located in central Montevideo) to Parque Lecocq by the end of 2015.

History
The government of Montevideo's web site describes the history of Parque Lecocq as follows:

The land where the park is currently belonged to Don Francisco Lecocq (1790-1882), an outstanding man in Montevideo of his time. He was educated in England, where he forged a spirit of initiative and enterprise that applied in the importing country to its plants and animals return to their land, which still can be enjoyed in the park.

It originated in a project by architect Mario Paysée, whose goal was to create a place with animal species around the world in natural settings. It occupies an area of 120 hectares, bordering the protected area of St Lucia Wetlands.

An arsonist set several fires at the park in early December 2008, burning seven acres.  The park was temporarily closed as a result, reopening March 2009. No animals were injured, but habitat was damaged.

Resident animals 
The park houses the following animals:

 capybara
 antelope
 mouflon
 fallow deer
 lion
 zebra
 emu
 Greater rhea
 peccary
 chital
 Pampas cat
 bobcat
 coati
 crab eating raccoon
 prehensile-tailed porcupine
 crab-eating fox
 gray fox
 monkey
 llama

References

Zoos in Uruguay
Parks in Montevideo